Aulaad is a 2020-2021 Pakistani television family drama series aired on ARY Digital. It is produced by Fahad Mustafa and Dr.Ali Kazmi under Big Bang Entertainment. It stars Syed Mohammed Ahmed, Marina Khan, Hassan Niazi, Furqan Qureshi, Nabeel Zuberi and Qudsia Ali in lead roles. The story revolves around the importance of relationship between parents and their expectations from sons.

Cast
Syed Mohammad Ahmed as Jalal Ahmed
Marina Khan as Zakiya
Hassan Niazi as Khurram
Furqan Qureshi as Adnan
Nabeel Zuberi as Bilal
Qudsia Ali as Mooni
Minsa Malik as Roshna
Sunita Marshall as Afreen
Mahenur Haider as Muskaan
Hina Javed as Farwa
Tabbasum Arif as Naghma
Humaira Bano as Rakhshanda
Zia Gurchani as Qayyum

Soundtrack
Aulaad's Original sound track is adapted from Rahim Shah's popular song "Jhoola".

Reception
Aulaad emerged as one of the strong serials produced during the first half of 2021. Shazia Kiran of DIVA Online included Aulaad in Half-yearly favorites for the year 2021 and wrote, "A drama that made us all cry buckets! Despite the unsettling end, the dramas makes up for a very realistic plot that many found themselves relating to".

References

2020 Pakistani television series debuts
2021 Pakistani television series endings